Bacterial outer membrane vesicles (OMVs) are vesicles of lipids released from the outer membranes of Gram-negative bacteria. These vesicles were the first bacterial membrane vesicles (MVs) to be discovered, while Gram-positive bacteria release vesicles as well. Outer membrane vesicles were first discovered and characterized using transmission-electron microscopy by Indian Scientist Prof. Smriti Narayan Chatterjee and J. Das in 1966-67. OMVs are ascribed the functionality to provide a manner to communicate among themselves, with other microorganisms in their environment and with the host. These vesicles are involved in trafficking bacterial cell signaling biochemicals, which may include DNA, RNA, proteins, endotoxins and allied virulence molecules. This communication happens in microbial cultures in oceans, inside animals, plants and even inside the human body.

Gram-negative bacteria deploy their periplasm to secrete OMVs for trafficking bacterial biochemicals to target cells in their environment. OMVs also carry endotoxic lipopolysaccharide initiating disease process in their host. This mechanism imparts a variety of benefits like, long-distance delivery of bacterial secretory cargo with minimized hydrolytic degradation and extra-cellular dilution, also supplemented with other supportive molecules (e.g., virulence factors) to accomplish a specific job and yet, keeping a safe-distance from the defense arsenal of the targeted cells. Biochemical signals trafficked by OMVs may vary largely during 'war and peace' situations. In 'complacent' bacterial colonies, OMVs may be used to carry DNA to 'related' microbes for genetic transformations, and also translocate cell signaling molecules for quorum sensing and biofilm formation. During 'challenge' from other cell types around, OMVs may be preferred to carry degradation and subversion enzymes. Likewise, OMVs may contain more of invasion proteins at the host-pathogen interface (Fig. 1). It is expected, that environmental factors around the secretory microbes are responsible for inducing these bacteria to synthesize and secrete specifically-enriched OMVs, physiologically suiting the immediate task. Thus, bacterial OMVs, being strong immunomodulators, can be manipulated for their immunogenic contents and utilized as potent pathogen-free vaccines for immunizing humans and animals against threatening infections.

Biogenesis and movement
Gram-negative bacteria have a double set of bilayers. An inner bilayer, the inner cell membrane, encloses the cytoplasm or cytosol. Surrounding this inner cell membrane there is a second bilayer called the bacterial outer membrane. The compartment or space between these two membranes is called the periplasm or periplasmic space. In addition, there is a firm cell wall consisting of peptidoglycan layer, which surrounds the cell membrane and occupies the periplasmic space. The peptidoglycan layer provides some rigidity for maintaining the bacterial cell shape, besides also protecting the microbe against challenging environments.

The first step in biogenesis of gram-negative bacterial OMVs, is bulging of outer membrane above the peptidoglycan layer. Accumulation of phospholipids in the outside of the outer membrane is thought to be the basis of this outwards bulging of the outer membrane. This accumulation of phospholipids can be regulated by the VacJ/Yrb ABC transport system that transfers phospholipids from the outside of OM to the inner side. Additionally, environmental conditions as sulfur depletion can trigger a state of phospholipid overproduction that causes increased OMV release.

The actual release of the vesicle from the outer membrane remains unclear. It is likely that vesicle structures can be released spontaneously. Alternatively, it has been suggested that few proteins 'rivet' the outer and cell membranes together, so that the periplasmic bulge protrudes like a 'ballooned' pocket of inflated periplasm out from the surface of the outer membrane. Lateral diffusion of 'rivet complexes' may help in pinching off large bulges of periplasm as OMVs.

Bacterial membrane vesicles dispersion along the cell surface was measured in live Escherichia coli, commensal bacteria common in the human gut. Antibiotic treatment altered vesicle dynamics, vesicle-to-membrane affinity, and surface properties of the cell membranes, generally enhancing vesicle transport along the surfaces of bacterial membranes and suggesting that their motion properties could be a signature of antibiotic stress. Despite this first high-resolution, quantitative tracking of bacterial OMVs, detailed experimental work is still awaited to understand the biomechanics of OMV biogenesis and transport. OMVs are also under focus of current research in exocytosis in prokaryotes via outer membrane vesicle trafficking for intra-species, inter-species and inter-kingdom cell signaling, which is slated to change our mindset on virulence of microbes, host-pathogen interactions and inter-relationships among variety of species in earth's ecosystem.

See also
 Exocytosis
 Host-pathogen interactions
 Host-pathogen interface
 List of bacterial disulfide oxidoreductases
 Virulence

References 

Membrane biology
Bacteriology